Gaëlle Deborah Enganamouit (born 9 June 1992) is a Cameroonian footballer who plays as a forward for Spanish club Málaga CF and the Cameroon women's national team.

Club career
Enganamouit previously played in the Serbian First League for Spartak Subotica, for whom she appeared in the UEFA Champions League. While playing for Spartak Enganamouit reportedly scored the fastest goal in women's football history, after two seconds.

In December 2013, Enganamouit announced her transfer to Swedish football, with newly promoted Damallsvenskan team Eskilstuna United.

League champions FC Rosengård signed Enganamouit to a two-year contract in November 2015, as a replacement for Anja Mittag. Enganamouit had been the 2015 Damallsvenskan top goalscorer with 18 goals as Eskilstuna finished second after mounting an unlikely title challenge. She was nominated for the BBC Women's footballer of the year award in early 2016, alongside Amandine Henry, Kim Little, Carli Lloyd and Becky Sauerbrunn.

On the opening day of the season, Enganamouit suffered an anterior cruciate ligament injury which was expected to rule her out for the entire 2016 campaign.

On 11 February 2017, Dalian Quanjian F.C. officially signed Enganamouit.

International career
She is a member of the Cameroonian national team and played at the 2012 Summer Olympics. She appeared in each game as a substitute; Cameroon lost each match.

At the 2015 Women's World Cup in Canada she scored a hat-trick in Cameroon's 6–0 win over Ecuador. During the 2015 World Cup game against defending champions Japan, her unnerving drive and powerful style lead to her being known as the "Freight Train" by Canadian fans.

On June 9, 2020, Gaëlle Enganamouit announced the end of her career.

Honours

Club 
Damallsvenskan League: Runner-up 2015

Individual 
Damallsvenskan top goal scorer: 2015
African Women's Footballer of the Year: 2015
IFFHS CAF Woman Team of the Decade 2011–2020

See also
 List of FIFA Women's World Cup hat-tricks

References

External links

 
 
 

1992 births
Living people
Footballers from Yaoundé
Cameroonian women's footballers
Women's association football forwards
ŽFK Spartak Subotica players
Eskilstuna United DFF players
FC Rosengård players
Dalian Quanjian F.C. players
Avaldsnes IL players
Málaga CF Femenino players
Damallsvenskan players
Chinese Women's Super League players
Toppserien players
Primera División (women) players
Cameroon women's international footballers
Olympic footballers of Cameroon
Footballers at the 2012 Summer Olympics
2015 FIFA Women's World Cup players
2019 FIFA Women's World Cup players
Cameroonian expatriate women's footballers
Cameroonian expatriate sportspeople in Serbia
Expatriate women's footballers in Serbia
Cameroonian expatriate sportspeople in Sweden
Expatriate women's footballers in Sweden
Cameroonian expatriate sportspeople in China
Expatriate women's footballers in China
Cameroonian expatriate sportspeople in Norway
Expatriate women's footballers in Norway
Cameroonian expatriate sportspeople in Spain
Expatriate women's footballers in Spain
African Women's Footballer of the Year winners